Onchimira cavifera is a species of sea slug, a dorid nudibranch, a shell-less marine gastropod mollusc in the family Onchidorididae.

Distribution
This species was described from Starichkov Island, near the Kamchatka peninsula, northwest Pacific Ocean.

Description
The size of the body attains 26 mm.

References

Onchidorididae
Gastropods described in 2009